Chemezov is a Slavic masculine surname, its feminine counterpart is Chemezova. It may refer to:
Nadezhda Chemezova (born 1980), Russian swimmer 
Sergey Chemezov (born 1952), Russian military officer, businessman and politician

Russian-language surnames